Bakakak hayam or Ayam Bekakak (Sundanese: , Bakakak hayam, Indonesia: Ayam Bekakak, English: Bakakak chicken or Splayed chicken) is a traditional Sundanese cuisine, originating from the  West Java, Indonesia. The form of chicken roasted above fire, after it is cleaned and added with special seasonings. Usually a chef uses a bamboo stick to grab a chicken to make it easy to grill. This dish will usually be served during a Sundanese wedding procession.

This traditional dish can be found during Weddings,  circumcision parties, but now it is found in many Sundanese restaurant places.

See also

 Cuisine of Indonesia
 Betutu (Bali and Lombok) 
 List of duck dishes

References 

Sundanese cuisine